Prince Adolf of Schaumburg-Lippe (20 July 1859 – 9 July 1916) was a German prince of the House of Schaumburg-Lippe and a Prussian General of the Cavalry. He was regent of the Principality of Lippe from 1895 to 1897 due to the incapacity of his distant relative Alexander, Prince of Lippe.

Early life
Prince Adolf was born on 20 July 1859 at Bückeburg Palace in Bückeburg, the capital of the small Principality of Schaumburg-Lippe in central Germany, during the reign of his paternal grandfather, George William, Prince of Schaumburg-Lippe. He was the seventh child and fourth son of Adolf, Hereditary Prince of Schaumburg-Lippe (1817–1893) and Princess Hermine of Waldeck and Pyrmont (1827–1910), a daughter of George II, Prince of Waldeck and Pyrmont.

On 21 November 1860, Adolf's father succeeded as Prince of Schaumburg-Lippe following the death of his own father, Prince George William. Prince Adolf was brought up with his siblings at Bückeburg Palace. From 1872 to 1874 he and his five years older brother, Prince Otto Heinrich, were educated by Hubert Maximilian Ermisch who would later become a wellknown archivist and historian.

Regent of Lippe 
Following the death of Prince Woldemar of Lippe on the 20 March 1895 and the ascension of Woldemar's brother Alexander, Adolf was appointed to act as regent of the Principality of Lippe due to Prince Alexander being unable to rule due to a mental illness. He continued to act as regent until 1897 when he was replaced by Count Ernst of Lippe-Biesterfeld.

Marriage
In 1890 Prince Adolf met Princess Viktoria of Prussia during a visit to Marie, Princess of Wied, mother of Queen Elisabeth of Romania. They were married on the 19 November 1890 in Berlin. She was a daughter of Frederick III, German Emperor, and as such Adolf was a brother-in-law to the last German Emperor, Wilhelm II. The wedding was attended by the Emperor Wilhelm, along with his wife Augusta Viktoria of Schleswig-Holstein and Victoria's mother, the widowed Empress Victoria. As Princess Victoria's mother was a member of the British royal family, many of her relatives also attended, including Princess Christian of Schleswig-Holstein. After the ceremony, the couple held a banquet, at which Emperor Wilhelm feelingly assured the pair of "his protection and friendly care".

After a prolonged honeymoon to several countries, the couple settled in Bonn where they acquired Palais Schaumburg as their residence. The marriage remained childless, though Princess Viktoria had a miscarriage within the first few months of marriage.

Orders and decorations

Ancestry

References

External links
 Adolf Schamburg

1859 births
1917 deaths
Generals of Cavalry (Prussia)
House of Lippe
People from Bückeburg
Princes of Schaumburg-Lippe
Regents of Germany
German hunters
Annulled Honorary Knights Grand Cross of the Order of the Bath
Sons of monarchs